Legislative elections were held in South West Africa on 15 September 1965. The whites-only election saw a victory for the National Party of South West Africa, which won all 18 seats in the Legislative Assembly.

Electoral system
The 18 members of the Legislative Assembly were elected from single-member constituencies. Prior to the elections six constituencies (Aroab, Mariental, Otjikondo, Usakos, Windhoek District and Windhoek North) were abolished and replaced by Erongo, Khomas-hochland, Stampriet, Walvisbay, Windhoek Klein and Windhoek South. The other constituencies were Gobabis, Grootfontein, Keetmanshoop, Luderitz, Maltahöhe, Okahandja, Otjiwarongo, Swakopmund, Tsumeb, Warmbad, Windhoek East, and Windhoek West.

Results

References

1965 in South West Africa
South-West Africa
Elections in Namibia
1965 elections
Election and referendum articles with incomplete results